The Frankford Huskies are a Canadian Junior "C" ice hockey team based in Frankford, Ontario, Canada.  They play in the Provincial Junior Hockey league.

History
The Frankford Huskies joined the Eastern Ontario Senior Hockey League in 2004.  They were named after their old junior hockey club that played in the Quinte-St. Lawrence Junior C Hockey League for many years. The relocated Baltimore Clippers were named after the long time American Hockey League team previously located in Baltimore, Maryland.

After four years in the EOSHL, the remaining four EOSHL teams merged with the two remaining Westerm senior teams to form the new Ontario Major Hockey "AAA" League to be known as Major League Hockey. In 2008, the Baltimore Clippers will begin their first season in the MLH with the Whitby Dunlops, the Norwood Vipers, the Coldwater Tundras, the Brantford Blast and the Dundas Real McCoys.  In the summer of 2009, the Clippers left Major League Hockey.

History Junior "C"
The Frankford Huskies are a Canadian Junior C team based out of the Frankford Arena in Frankford, Ontario playing in the Provincial Junior Hockey League (OHA). The team started play with the 2021-22 season.  They are part of the East Conference and the Tod Division.

The franchise was formed out of the sale of the Kitchener Dutchmen and the elevation of the Ayr Centennials to Junior B. The PJHL franchise rights were used to form the Frankford Huskies franchise.

Season-by-season record
''Note: GP = Games played, W = Wins, L = Losses, T = Ties, OTL = Overtime losses, Pts = Points, GF = Goals for, GA = Goals against

External links
Clippers Homepage

Eastern Ontario Senior Hockey League teams
2004 establishments in Ontario
Ice hockey clubs established in 2004
2009 disestablishments in Ontario
Ice hockey clubs disestablished in 2009
Northumberland County, Ontario